HEAS may refer to:

 Hebrew Emigrant Aid Society, an organization that ran shelters for recent Jewish immigrants
 Hebrew Immigrant Aid Society (HIAS)
 High Energy Amateur Science